Impress Telefilm Limited is a media production house in Bangladesh formed in 2003. The company produces film, drama, and drama serials, music videos, variety shows, magazine programmes, musical programmes and documentaries as well as TV commercials. It was founded by Faridur Reza Sagar.

From Bangladesh 9 times 9 different films of Impress Telefilm has got Bangladeshi submissions for the Oscar for Foreign Language Film Competition.

All Film & Telefilm List 

List of the films distributed and produced by Impress Telefilm

See also
 Cinema of Bangladesh

References

External links
 
 IMDb profile

Television in Bangladesh
Film production companies of Bangladesh